This is an article about qualification for the 2018 Boys' U18 Volleyball European Championship.

Qualification summary

Pool standing procedure
 Number of matches won
 Match points
 Sets ratio
 Points ratio
 Result of the last match between the tied teams

Match won 3–0 or 3–1: 3 match points for the winner, 0 match points for the loser
Match won 3–2: 2 match points for the winner, 1 match point for the loser

Direct qualification

Qualification
The winners of each pools and the best three second placed teams qualified for final round.
Pools composition

Pool A

|}

|}

Pool B

|}

|}

Pool C

|}

|}

Pool D

|}

|}

Pool E

|}

|}

Pool F

|}

|}

Pool G

|}

|}

Ranking of the second rank teams

|}

References

Boys' Youth European Volleyball Championship
Europe